Folagbade Olateru Olagbegi III, CFR, SAN (June 26, 1941 – April 17, 2019) was the traditional ruler of Owo (Olowo of Owo), Ondo State, Nigeria. He was the eldest son of the late Olowo of Owo, Sir Olateru Olagbegi (1910–1998). He succeeded his father as the Olowo of Owo in 1999 but was given the staff of office as the Olowo of Owo on December 11, 2003 by late Olusegun Agagu, former executive governor of Ondo State. He celebrated his 15th coronation anniversary in 2014

Background and education

Oba Folagbade Olateru-Olagbegi was born into the ruling family in Owo. He was the eldest son of the late Olowo of Owo, Sir Titus Olateru Olagbegi II. He received his first degree in law from London, UK and attended Nigeria Law school, in 1968. Whilst he was working at the law school he married the late Bisi Cole and they would have four children. He rose to the peak of his career as a Senior Advocate of Nigeria.

He was married to Ololade Olateru-Olagbegi, a barrister and law lecturer at Ondo State University, and they were blessed with children.

Career

Oba Folagbade obtained a bachelor's degree in Law from London, UK. He later returned to Nigeria to practice Law under the late Fatai Williams. He was a lecturer in the Nigerian Law School, where he retired as a reader in 1999 and a Senior Advocate of Nigeria (SAN). He was appointed as Chancellor of University of Benin (Nigeria)  in 2005 and later University of Abuja. He was Chancellor of the University of Jos, a federal university in Nigeria. Folagbade was the former chairman of the Ondo State Council of Oba (King)

Oba Olateru-Olagbegi died on April 16, 2019 at the age of 77.

References

Yoruba monarchs
Nigerian traditional rulers
People from Owo
Folagbade
1941 births
2019 deaths
Nigerian Law School alumni
Yoruba academics
Academic staff of the Nigerian Law School
Senior Advocates of Nigeria
Yoruba legal professionals
University of Benin (Nigeria) people
University of Abuja people